Arjumand Banu is a Awami League politician and the former Member of the Bangladesh Parliament of women's reserved seat.

Career
Banu was elected to parliament from women's reserved seat as an Awami League candidate in 1973.

References

Awami League politicians
Living people
1st Jatiya Sangsad members
Women members of the Jatiya Sangsad
Year of birth missing (living people)